The 1997 French Open was a tennis tournament that took place on the outdoor clay courts at the Stade Roland Garros in Paris, France. The tournament was held from 26 May until 8 June. It was the 101st staging of the French Open, and the second Grand Slam tennis event of 1997.

Seniors

Men's singles

 Gustavo Kuerten defeated  Sergi Bruguera, 6–3, 6–4, 6–2
• It was Kuerten's 1st career Grand Slam singles title (and his 1st title overall).

Women's singles

 Iva Majoli defeated  Martina Hingis, 6–4, 6–2
• It was Majoli's 1st and only career Grand Slam singles title.

Men's doubles

 Yevgeny Kafelnikov /  Daniel Vacek defeated  Todd Woodbridge /  Mark Woodforde, 7–6, 4–6, 6–3
• It was Kafelnikov's 2nd career Grand Slam doubles title and his 2nd (consecutive) title at the French Open.
• It was Vacek's 2nd career Grand Slam doubles title and his 2nd (consecutive) title at the French Open.

Women's doubles

 Gigi Fernández /  Natalia Zvereva defeated  Mary Joe Fernández /  Lisa Raymond, 6–2, 6–3
• It was Fernández' 16th career Grand Slam doubles title and her 6th and last title at the French Open.
• It was Zvereva's 17th career Grand Slam doubles title and her 6th and last title at the French Open.

Mixed doubles

 Rika Hiraki /  Mahesh Bhupathi defeated  Lisa Raymond /  Patrick Galbraith, 6–4, 6–1
• It was Hiraki's 1st and only career Grand Slam mixed doubles title.
• It was Bhupathi's 1st career Grand Slam mixed doubles title.

Juniors

Boys' singles
 Daniel Elsner defeated  Luis Horna, 6–4, 6–4

Girls' singles
 Justine Henin defeated  Cara Black, 4–6, 6–4, 6–4

Boys' doubles
 José de Armas /  Luis Horna defeated  Arnaud Di Pasquale /  Julien Jeanpierre, 6–4, 2–6, 7–5

Girls' doubles
 Cara Black /  Irina Selyutina defeated  Maja Matevžič /  Katarina Srebotnik, 6–0, 5–7, 7–5

Notes

External links
 French Open official website

 
1997 in French tennis
1997 in Paris